Diego Raul Giustozzi (born 1 August 1978) is an Argentine futsal manager who manages Vietnam.

Career

Playing career

Giustozzi started his career with Argentine side Lugano (Argentina), helping them win their only league title. In 1999, he signed for Firenze in Italy. In 2003, Giustozzi helped Argentina win the 2003 Copa América de Futsal, their first major trophy. In 2005, he signed for Spanish top flight club Segovia Futsal.

In 2010, he signed for Canottieri Lazio in the Italian third tier, helping them achieve consecutive promotions to the Italian tip flight. In 2012, Giustozzi signed for Italian top flight team Real Rieti. In 2013, he returned to River in Argentina.

Managerial career

In 2013, he was appointed manager of Italian outfit Real Rieti. In 2014, Giustozzi was appointed manager of Argentina, helping them win the 2016 FIFA Futsal World Cup, their only World Cup.

In 2018, he was appointed manager of ElPozo Murcia in Spain. In 2022, Giustozzi was appointed manager of Vietnam.

References

1978 births
Argentine expatriate sportspeople in Italy
Argentine expatriate sportspeople in Spain
Argentine expatriate sportspeople in Vietnam
Argentine men's futsal players
Living people